Iriania is a genus of moths of the family Yponomeutidae.

Species
Iriania anisoptera - Diakonoff, 1955 
Iriania auriflua - Diakonoff, 1955 
Iriania lutescens - Diakonoff, 1955 
Iriania minor - Diakonoff, 1955 
Iriania mystica - Diakonoff, 1955 
Iriania ochlodes - Diakonoff, 1955 
Iriania tricosma - Diakonoff, 1955 

Yponomeutidae